John Patrick Kirby (May 30, 1942 – May 30, 2017) is a former professional American football player who played right outside linebacker for seven seasons for the Minnesota Vikings and the New York Giants. Kirby died on May 30, 2017, his 75th birthday.

References

1942 births
Living people
American football linebackers
Minnesota Vikings players
Nebraska Cornhuskers football players
New York Giants players
People from David City, Nebraska
Players of American football from Nebraska